The Primetime Emmy Award for Outstanding Lighting Design / Lighting Direction for a Variety Series is awarded to one television series each year. Prior to 2011, the award was bestowed as Outstanding Lighting Direction (Electronic, Multi-Camera) for Variety, Music or Comedy Programming. Separate awards now recognize series and variety specials.

In the following list, the first titles listed in gold are the winners; those not in gold are nominees, which are listed in alphabetical order. The years given are those in which the ceremonies took place.

Winners and nominations

Outstanding Lighting Direction (Electronic)

1980s

Outstanding Lighting Direction (Electronic) for a Series 
{| class="wikitable" style="width:100%"
|- bgcolor="#bebebe"
! width="5%" | Year
! width="25%" | Program
! width="20%" | Episode
! width="45%" | Nominees
! width="5%" | Network
|-
| rowspan=5 style="text-align:center" | 1983(35th)
|- style="background:#FAEB86"
|Solid Gold
| align=center| "Dolly Parton"
| Bob Dickinson, Frank Olivas
| Syndicated
|-
| rowspan=2|Benson
| align=center| "Boys Night Out"
| Alan K. Walker
| rowspan=2|ABC
|-
| align=center| "Death in a Funny Position"
| Alan K. Walker, John C. Zak
|-
|Rock 'n' Roll Tonite
| align=center| "Molly Hatchett and Quiet Riot"
| Mikel Neiers, Kieran Healy
| Syndicated
|-
| rowspan=5 style="text-align:center" | 1984(36th)
|- style="background:#FAEB86"
|Solid Gold
| align=center| "198"
| Bob Dickinson, Frank Olivas
| Syndicated
|-
|Night Court
| align=center| "Birthday Boy"
| Mikel Neiers
| rowspan=2|NBC
|-
|Night Court
| align=center| "Bull's Baby"
| John Appelroth
|-
|Oh Madeline
| align=center| "Sisters"
| Alan K. Walker
| ABC
|-
| rowspan=5 style="text-align:center" | 1985(37th)
|- style="background:#FAEB86"
|Mr. Belvedere
| align=center| "Strangers in the Night"
| George Spiro Dibie
| ABC
|-
| rowspan=2|Night Court
| align=center| "Billie's Valentine"
| John Appelroth
| rowspan=2|NBC
|-
| align=center| "Bull Gets a Kid"
| Mark Buxbaum
|-
|Solid Gold
| align=center| "230"
| Bob Dickinson
| Syndicated
|-
| rowspan=6 style="text-align:center" | 1986(38th)
|- style="background:#FAEB86"
|Solid Gold
| align=center| "283"
| Bob Dickinson
| Syndicated
|-
|The Golden Girls
| align=center| "On Golden Girls"
| Alan K. Walker
| rowspan=3|NBC
|-
|Night Court
| align=center| "Leon We Hardly Knew Ye"
| George Spiro Dibie
|-
|Silver Spoons
| align=center| "Rick Sings"
| Mark Buxbaum
|-
|Who's the Boss?
| align=center| "Charmed Lives"
| Mark J. Levin
| ABC
|-
| rowspan=5 style="text-align:center" | 1987(39th)
|- style="background:#FAEB86"
|Growing Pains
| align=center| "My Brother, Myself"
| George Spiro Dibie
| ABC
|-
|Keep on Cruisin| align=center| "Mark C. Bloome"
| Jeff Engel
| CBS
|-
|Married... with Children
| align=center| "But I Didn't Shoot the Deputy"
| Mark Buxbaum
| Fox
|-
|Who's the Boss?
| align=center| "The Proposal"
| Mark J. Levin
| ABC
|-
|}Outstanding Lighting Direction (Electronic) for a Comedy Series1990sOutstanding Lighting Direction (Electronic)2000sOutstanding Lighting Direction (Electronic, Multi-Camera) for Variety, Music or Comedy Programming2010sOutstanding Lighting Design / Lighting Direction for a Variety Series'''

2020s

Programs with multiple awards

7 awards
 Home Improvement4 awards
 Saturday Night Live The Voice3 awards
 Solid Gold2 awards
 Dancing with the Stars Growing Pains So You Think You Can DancePrograms with multiple nominations
Totals include nominations for  Outstanding Lighting Direction (Electronic) for a Drama Series, Variety Series, Miniseries, Movie or Special.

15 nominations
 Dancing with the Stars13 nominations
 Saturday Night Live12 nominations
 American Idol11 nominations
 The Voice9 nominations
 So You Think You Can Dance8 nominations
 Home Improvement7 nominations
 America's Got Talent Night Court6 nominations
 Late Show with David Letterman Who's the Boss?5 nominations
 The Golden Girls Late Night with Conan O'Brien Solid Gold4 nominations
 Sister, Sister3 nominations
 Growing Pains Jimmy Kimmel Live! The John Larroquette Show Roseanne The Tonight Show Starring Johnny Carson The Tonight Show with Jay Leno2 nominations
 Benson Family Ties The Larry Sanders Show Living Single Married... with Children The Masked Singer Politically Incorrect with Bill Maher''

Notes

References

Lighting Design / Lighting Direction for a Variety Series